Adrienne Horvath (23 March 1925 – 4 July 2012) was a French politician. She represented the 3rd district of Gard in the French National Assembly from 19 March 1978 to 22 May 1981, as a member of the French Communist Party.

She was born in Tuyên Quang in French Indochina (today Vietnam). She was first elected to the assembly in 1978, succeeding Roger Roucaute, also of the Communist party, and was reelected in 1981.

Horvath was mayor of Saint-Martin-de-Valgalgues from 1977 to 1989.

She died at Saint-Martin-de-Valgalgues at the age of 87.

References 

1925 births
2012 deaths
People from Tuyên Quang province
People of French Indochina
French Communist Party politicians
Deputies of the 6th National Assembly of the French Fifth Republic
Deputies of the 7th National Assembly of the French Fifth Republic
Women mayors of places in France
20th-century French women politicians
Women members of the National Assembly (France)